Ella (Lit. "water fall") is a small town in the Badulla District of Uva Province, Sri Lanka governed by an Urban Council. The area has a rich bio-diversity, dense with numerous varieties of flora and fauna. Ella is surrounded by hills covered with cloud forests and tea plantations. The town has a cooler climate than surrounding lowlands, due to its elevation. The Ella Gap allows views across the southern plains of Sri Lanka.

Transport

Road
Located on the Colombo-Badulla railway line, and the A16 highway (Beragala-Hali Ela) a part of the Colombo-Badulla road.

Rail
The station has one platform and all trains running on the Main Line stop at the station. The station opened in July 1918.

Facilities
Notable government institutions are :
 Police station
 Railway station
 Main post office

Attractions

 Dhowa temple, a 2,000-year-old rock temple, is located on the Badulla-Bandarawela Road. It contains a  unfinished Buddha statue carved into the surrounding rock.  
 Bambaragala Peak
 Ella Rock, a lookout point
 Little Adam's Peak, a  pyramidal-shaped hill, located to the south-east of the town. Named after the larger Adam's Peak.
 Nine Arches Bridge, Demodara
 Diyaluma Falls, a  waterfall
 Yahalamadiththa temple
 Mahamevnawa Buddhist Monastery
 Ravana cave
 Nildiya pokuna

Demographics

See also
Towns in Uva
History of Uva Province

References

External links 

Towns in Badulla District